Zhetisay (also transliterated as Jetisay, Žetisaj and Zhetysay) is a city in Kazakhstan and is the administrative center of Maktaaral District in Turkistan Region. Population:

References 
 
 

Populated places in Turkistan Region